Jackson Hole Airport  is a United States public airport located seven miles (11 km) north of Jackson, in Teton County, Wyoming. In 2019, it was the busiest airport in Wyoming by passenger traffic with 455,000 passengers. During peak seasons of summer and winter, Jackson Hole has nonstop airline service from up to 15 destinations throughout the United States. The airport is served year-round by Alaska Airlines, American Airlines, Delta Air Lines and United Airlines and seasonally by Sun Country Airlines.

Jackson Hole Airport is the only commercial airport in the United States located inside a national park, in this case Grand Teton. (The Provincetown Municipal Airport in Massachusetts is on land leased from the National Park Service, but it is not in a national park.)

History
The airport was created in the 1930s as the best place to put an airport in Teton County. The airport was declared a national monument in 1943 and merged with Grand Teton National Park in 1950. The runway was extended to its current length in 1959. President John F. Kennedy landed in an Army helicopter here on September 25, 1963. In the late 1970s jets began using the existing runway. The area is noise sensitive and the airport allows no jets louder than stage III. The airport is a popular mating ground for the rare sage grouse.

The original Frontier Airlines (1950-1986) was the first carrier to serve Jackson Hole, which began in 1959 with routes to Denver, Salt Lake City, and Billings using Douglas DC-3s, Convair 340s, and the Convair-580. This was later upgraded to the Boeing 737-200 series aircraft shortly before shutting down in 1986 due to the Airline Deregulation Act. Other than some commuter airlines that briefly served the airport, Frontier had the only service until Western Airlines began flights to Salt Lake City in 1983 using Boeing 737-200s. Since then the airport really took off and has also seen service by Continental Airlines, Northwest Airlines, Horizon Air, Big Sky Airlines, and Southwest Airlines in the past as well as many other commuter carriers.

The airport once had an unusual terminal resembling a pioneer log cabin. The terminal was completely rebuilt between 2009 and 2014. The new terminal, designed by Gensler, still blends with the unique surroundings of the national park with exposed wood, fireplaces, and nature photography throughout. The park limited the height of the terminal building to 18 feet. The terminal design received an American Institute of Architects Honor Award in 2014. In the spring of 2021, construction began on relocating the pre-security Café to baggage claim. Doing this gave check in counter space for Allegiant Airlines. In 2021, Allegiant left the airport due to small flight loads and the inability to reliably turn a profit at the airport. The next phase of construction will modernize and expand the TSA checkpoint and give more gate space to American Airlines. In the spring of 2022 when the airport is closed, construction will commence on rebuilding Jedediah's restaurant and adding two more gates.

Facilities 

Jackson Hole Airport is noise sensitive and bans older, noisier aircraft with stage-II engines.

Due to a short runway at high altitude, the largest aircraft seen regularly at the Jackson Hole Airport is the Boeing 757-200 operated by Delta Air Lines on flights to Atlanta. Other aircraft typically seen include the Airbus A319, A320, Embraer 175, and the Bombardier CRJ700. Due to these conditions, Jackson Hole Airport does not typically see stretched versions of aircraft such as the Airbus A321 or Boeing 737-900, as they become weight restricted when taking off.

The airport currently has eleven hard stand gates and three baggage carousels. Jackson Hole Airport does not have jet bridges so passengers board aircraft via ramps. The airport terminal has a restaurant and gift shop post security as well as a cafe by the baggage claim area. The airport is served by Alamo, Avis, Budget, Enterprise and National rental car companies. Dollar, Hertz, and Thrifty offer shuttle service from the airport to in-town rental cars.

Jackson Hole Airport is one of 16 airports that employs its security screeners under contract with the Transportation Security Administration's Screening Partnership Program. Screeners are employed by the Jackson Hole Airport Board rather than TSA.

Airlines and destinations

Statistics
In the year ending December 31, 2019 the airport had 27,325 aircraft operations, average 75 per day: 37% general aviation, 29% air taxi, 33% airline and 1% military. 21 aircraft at the time were based at the airport: 17 single-engine, 2 multi-engine, and 2 jet.

Top destinations

Accidents and incidents
On September 11, 1988, a Snowy Butte Aviation Beechcraft Super King Air nosedived and crashed during a nighttime take off due to pilot fatigue and spatial disorientation. The sole occupant, the pilot, was killed.
On August 17, 1996, a U.S. Air Force C-130 Hercules aircraft assigned to the 317th Airlift Group at Dyess AFB, Texas was unable to clear Sheep Mountain, crashing into it and killing all nine aboard. The aircraft was supporting the United States Secret Service as part of visit by President Bill Clinton to the area.
On December 20, 2000, actress and resident Sandra Bullock survived the crash of a chartered business jet at Jackson Hole Airport. The aircraft hit a snowbank instead of the runway, shearing off the nose gear and nose cone and damaging the wings.
On June 27, 2005, John T. Walton, son of Walmart founder Sam Walton, died when his CGS Hawk Arrow homebuilt aircraft (registered as an "experimental aircraft" under FAA regulations) that he was piloting crashed in Jackson, Wyoming. Walton's plane crashed at 12:20 p.m. local time (1820 GMT) shortly after taking off from Jackson Hole Airport.

Gallery

References

External links

Airports in Wyoming
Buildings and structures in Grand Teton National Park
Buildings and structures in Jackson, Wyoming
Transportation in Teton County, Wyoming
Airports established in 1939
1939 establishments in Wyoming